The 1999–2000 Central Connecticut Blue Devils men's basketball team represented Central Connecticut State University during the 1999–2000 NCAA Division I men's basketball season. The Blue Devils were led by fourth-year head coach Howie Dickenman, and played their home games at the William H. Detrick Gymnasium in New Britain, Connecticut as members of the Northeast Conference. After finishing atop the conference regular season standings, the Blue Devils also won the Northeast Conference tournament to receive the school's first-ever bid to the NCAA Division I men's tournament. An No. 15 seed in the Midwest region, Central Connecticut fell to No. 2 seed Iowa State, 88–78, to finish the season with a record of 25–6 (15–3 NEC).

Roster 

Source

Schedule and results

|-
!colspan=12 style=| Regular season

|-
!colspan=9 style=| NEC Tournament

|-
!colspan=9 style=| NCAA Tournament

Source

References

Central Connecticut Blue Devils men's basketball seasons
Central Connecticut Blue Devils
Central Connecticut
Central Connecticut Blue Devils men's basketball team
Central Connecticut Blue Devils men's basketball team